Narine Bidhesi (born 5 April 1965) is a Trinidadian cricketer. He played in eleven first-class and six List A matches for Trinidad and Tobago from 1989 to 1993.

See also
 List of Trinidadian representative cricketers

References

External links
 

1965 births
Living people
Trinidad and Tobago cricketers